The FA England Awards is an award ceremony hosted by The Football Association. The inaugural edition took place on 3 February 2003, although The FA Women's Football Awards started in 1999.

Senior Men's Player of the Year

The Senior Men's Player of the Year is a football award presented by The FA to the most outstanding performers of the England national team. The award was originally given out at the end of the calendar year but from 2020-21 it moved to a seasonal honour and is decided by an online poll by England fans on EnglandFootball.com (formerly TheFA.com).

Below is a list of all the recipients of this award:

By player

By club

Senior Women's Player of the Year

By player

By club

England Men's U21 Player of the Year

England Women's U23 Player of the Year

England Men's Youth Player of the Year

England Women's Youth Player of the Year

Disability Player of the Year

Club England Team of the Year

England C Player of the Year

Lifetime achievement award

Brian Woolnough Writers' Award

See also

 List of sports awards honoring women

References

External links
 

English football trophies and awards
England national football team
Awards established in 2003
2003 establishments in England
England Awards
Annual events in England
Annual sporting events in the United Kingdom
England women's national football team
English women's football trophies and awards